Mononeuria is a genus of flowering plants belonging to the family Caryophyllaceae.

Its native range is Subarctic America to USA.

Species
Species:

Mononeuria caroliniana 
Mononeuria cumberlandensis 
Mononeuria glabra 
Mononeuria groenlandica 
Mononeuria minima 
Mononeuria muscorum 
Mononeuria nuttallii 
Mononeuria paludicola 
Mononeuria patula 
Mononeuria uniflora

References

Caryophyllaceae
Caryophyllaceae genera